Nikos Iordanidis (born 17 July 1980) is a Greek former professional footballer who played as a forward.

Career
Born in Eptamyloi, Serres, He made his debut in professional football with OFI Crete in the Alpha Ethniki at age 18 in 1999. That season, he was voted as Super League's young footballer of the year. Iordanidis had hoped to join an Italian Serie B side in 2003, but OFI sent him on loan to Alpha Ethniki rivals Akratitos F.C. instead. Soon after, OFI cancelled his contract leaving him free to join Kallithea F.C. in January 2004.

Iordanidis had a brief spell in the Cypriot First Division with AEP Paphos F.C. and returned to Greece where he has played in the second and third divisions, most recently signing with Pefki, a club contesting in the Regional Championship, based in the homonymous northern suburb of Athens.

References

External links
Profile at EPAE.org
Profile at Onsports.gr
Profile at Guardian Football

1980 births
Living people
Greek footballers
Greek expatriate footballers
OFI Crete F.C. players
A.P.O. Akratitos Ano Liosia players
Kallithea F.C. players
Panserraikos F.C. players
Olympiacos Volos F.C. players
AEP Paphos FC players
Cypriot First Division players
Super League Greece players
Expatriate footballers in Cyprus
Panegialios F.C. players
Association football forwards
Footballers from Serres